Pita Pit is a Canadian quick-service restaurant franchise serving pita sandwiches with fresh vegetables, grilled meat and sauces. Its Canadian and global headquarters are in Kingston, Ontario. Its United States headquarters are in Coeur d'Alene, Idaho. As of September 2021, it is owned by Foodtastic.

History

The first shop was opened by Nelson Lang and John Sotiriadis in 1995 near Queen's University in Kingston, Ontario. The restaurant was located near the college and aimed at students in the hopes it would be "recession-proof". The store stayed open until late, providing a healthier and fresher late night food option to conventional fast food. 

In 1997, Pita Pit started to expand within Canada, and in 1999 they began franchising in the United States.

The first Pita Pit location outside Canada and the United States opened in Auckland, New Zealand, in August 2007. The business was set up by Chris Henderson, a New Zealander returning from Canada, and Duane Dalton, the husband of netballer Tania Dalton.

By 2011, Pita Pit had expanded to 350 stores in Canada, the United States, New Zealand, Panama, South Korea and Brazil.

By 2020, it had over 500 locations in India, France, Brazil, Panama, Trinidad and Tobago, the United Kingdom, New Zealand, Australia, Singapore, United Arab Emirates, Ireland and Sweden.

On September 1st 2021, it was announced that Québécois restaurant franchiser Foodtastic had acquired Pita Pit.

Pita Pit International

New Zealand and Australia

Pita Pit New Zealand has 85 stores around New Zealand, including 36 in Auckland. This down from about 90 stores in 2020 and more than 100 stores in 2017, but still more than the 65 it had in 2014, and 18 it had in 2011.

The business also has nine stores from Australia, down from 14 in 2017.

The company is based in Takapuna, Auckland where it opened its first store in 2007.

Pita Pit New Zealand started actively seeking franchises in 2011, and by 2017 the vast majority of stores were franchisees.

The chain introduced a diabetes-friendly menu in 2016, and introduced a fillings limit in 2019. It started to trial virtual kitchens in 2020, after many of its stores were unable to open during the COVID-19 pandemic.

References

External links
Pita Pit site (Canada)

Companies based in Kingston, Ontario
Fast-food chains of Canada
Fast-food chains of New Zealand
Fast-food chains of the United States
Restaurants established in 1995
1995 establishments in Ontario